Sivaramakrishnan may refer to:

Laxman  Sivaramakrishnan, Indian cricketer
Vidyut  Sivaramakrishnan, Indian cricketer